Smiles is a 1919 American silent war comedy film directed by Arvid E. Gillstrom and starring Jane Lee, Katherine Lee, Ethel Fleming, Val Paul, and Carmen Phillips. The film was released by Fox Film Corporation on February 23, 1919.

Plot

Cast
Jane Lee as Jane
Katherine Lee as Katherine
Ethel Fleming as Lucille Forrest
Val Paul as Tom Hayes
Carmen Phillips as Madame Yelba
Charles Arling as Wagner
Katherine Griffith as Housekeeper
Barbara Maier as Little Girl

Preservation
The film is now considered lost.

See also
List of lost films
1937 Fox vault fire

References

External links

1910s war comedy films
American war comedy films
1919 films
American silent feature films
American black-and-white films
Fox Film films
Lost American films
1919 comedy films
1910s American films
Silent American comedy films
Silent war comedy films
1910s English-language films